Harshvardhan Joshi (born 13 November 1995) is an Indian mountaineer and sustainability advocate from Vasai, Maharashtra. He has climbed six mountains of 6000 meters and above in his mountaineering career which started in 2016. Joshi reached the summit of Mount Everest on 23 May 2021 in a carbon neutral effort.

Early life
Joshi was born in Vasai, Maharashtra, and schooled in his native village. He graduated with a Bachelor of Engineering degree in IT from Mumbai University. Besides completing numerous mountaineering training, he finished a solo Ironman 70.3 distance triathlon during the pandemic in October 2020.

Mountaineering Expeditions
Joshi climbed Stok Kangri (20,187 ft) in 2016. On 4 October 2019, Joshi embarked on an expedition to climb Himlung Himal (7126 m, 23379.27 ft), a mountain in the remote Nar-Phu region of Nepal.

On 23 May 2021, Joshi completed his climb to Mt. Everest. During his climb, he contracted the coronavirus and faced two cyclones.

Training
 Method of Instruction (Jawahar Institute of Mountaineering and Winter Sport, Jammu & Kashmir)

Honors and awards 

 Fit India Champion, Ministry of Youth Affairs and Sports
 International Advertising Association (IAA) Olive Crown Awards - Young Green Crusader of the Year 2022

See also
Indian summiters of Mount Everest - Year wise
List of Mount Everest records of India

References

External links
 
 

Indian mountain climbers
1995 births
University of Mumbai alumni
Living people
20th-century Indian people
21st-century Indian people